Harry William "Swede" Nordstrom (October 11, 1896 – February 13, 1963) was an American football guard who played two seasons in the National Football League with the New York Giants and Brooklyn Lions. He played college football at Trinity College and attended Bay Ridge High School in Bay Ridge, Brooklyn, New York.

References

External links
Just Sports Stats

1896 births
1963 deaths
American football defensive ends
Trinity Bantams football players
New York Giants players
Brooklyn Lions players
Sportspeople from Brooklyn
Players of American football from New York City